The Kiel mutiny was a major revolt by sailors of the German High Seas Fleet on 3 November 1918. The revolt triggered the German revolution which was to sweep aside the monarchy within a few days. It ultimately led to the end of the German Empire and to the establishment of the Weimar Republic.

Background 
By September 1918, Kaiser Wilhelm II was advised to ask the Triple Entente to grant an immediate cease fire and put the government on a democratic footing.

On 3 October, the Kaiser appointed Prince Maximilian of Baden as the new imperial chancellor. In his cabinet the Social Democrats (SPD) also took on responsibility. The most prominent and highest-ranking was Philipp Scheidemann, a prominent leader of the SPD as undersecretary without portfolio.

Morale in the High Seas Fleet
Following the Battle of Jutland in 1916, many of the capital ships of the Imperial Navy had seen reduced activity outside the Baltic and had remained in harbor. Many officers and crewmen volunteered to transfer to the submarines and light vessels which still had a major part to play in the war. The discipline and spirit of those who remained, on lower rations, with the battleships tied up at dock-side, inevitably suffered. On 2 August 1917, 350 crewmen of the dreadnought  staged a protest demonstration in Wilhelmshaven. Two of the ringleaders were executed by firing squad while others were sentenced to prison. During the remaining months of the war, secret sailors' councils were formed on a number of the capital ships. Richard Stumpf wrote a book Warum die Flotte zerbrach – Kriegstagebuch eines christlichen Arbeiters (Why the fleet broke up – war diary of a Christian worker) of his war memories, explaining the conditions that led to the demise of German Imperial Navy. This was later presented to a German Weimar Republic parliament (Reichstag) commission and is discussed at Naval Academy Mürwik naval history classes.

Naval order of 24 October 1918 

In October 1918, the imperial naval command in Kiel under Admiral Franz von Hipper planned to dispatch the fleet for a final battle against the Royal Navy in the English Channel. The naval order of 24 October 1918 and the preparations to sail triggered a mutiny among the affected sailors and then a general revolution which was to sweep aside the monarchy within a few days.

Wilhelmshaven mutiny 

The sailors' revolt started on the Schillig Roads off Wilhelmshaven, where the German fleet had anchored in expectation of a planned battle. During the night from 28 to 30 October 1918 some crews refused to obey orders. Sailors on board three ships from the Third Navy Squadron refused to weigh anchor.

However, when, a day later, some torpedo boats pointed their cannons at these ships, the mutineers gave up and were led away without any resistance. Nevertheless, the naval command had to drop its plans as it was felt that the crew's loyalty could no longer be relied upon. The Third Navy Squadron was ordered back to Kiel.

Sailors revolt in Kiel 

The squadron commander, Vizeadmiral Hugo Kraft, exercised a maneuver with his battleships in the Heligoland Bight. When it "functioned perfectly (tadellos funktionierte)" he believed he was in command of his crews again. The only stop the squadron made on its way to Kiel was in Holtenau, where nearly 150 mutineers were put under arrest to be transported to Arrestanstalt, the military prison in Kiel, and to Fort Herwarth in the north of Kiel.

The sailors and stokers sought to prevent the fleet from setting sail again and to achieve the release of their comrades. Some 250 met in the evening of 1 November in the Union House in Kiel. Delegations sent to their officers requesting the mutineers' release were not heard. The sailors were now looking for closer ties to the unions, the Independent Social Democratic Party of Germany (USPD) and the SPD. Thereupon the Union House was closed by police, leading to an even larger joint open-air meeting on 2 November, at the large drill ground (Großer Exerzierplatz).

Led by the sailor Karl Artelt, who worked in the repair ship yard for torpedo boats in Kiel-Wik, and by the mobilized shipyard worker Lothar Popp, both USPD members, the sailors called for a large meeting the following day at the same place. This call was heeded by several thousand people on the afternoon of 3 November with workers' representatives also being present. The slogan "Frieden und Brot" (peace and bread) was raised showing that the sailors and workers demanded not only the release of the imprisoned but also the end of the war and the improvement of food provisions. Eventually the people supported Artelt's call to free the prisoners and they moved in the direction of the military prison.

Sublieutenant Steinhäuser, who had orders to stop the demonstrators, ordered his patrol to give warning shots and then to shoot directly into the demonstrators. Seven men were killed and 29 were seriously injured. Some demonstrators also opened fire. Steinhäuser was severely injured by rifle-butt blows and shots, but contrary to later statements, he was not killed. After this incident, commonly viewed as the starting point of the German revolution, the demonstrators dispersed and the patrol withdrew.

Protesters take over Kiel 
Wilhelm Souchon, the governor of the naval station, initially asked for outside troops but revoked his request for military assistance when his staff claimed the situation was under control. Souchon had been deployed to Kiel only a few days earlier on 30 October 1918 and therefore had to rely heavily on his staff. On 4 November, however, the request was renewed, resulting in six infantry companies being brought to Kiel. Some units stayed in the city quarter Wik and in the Marinestation der Ostsee.

On the morning of 4 November groups of mutineers moved through the town. Sailors in a large barracks compound in a northern district of Kiel (Wik Garnison: Tirpitz Hafen) refused obedience: after a division inspection of the commander, spontaneous demonstrations took place. Karl Artelt organized the first soldiers' council, and soon many more were set up. The governor of the navy station had to negotiate and to order the withdrawal of the units. The imprisoned sailors and stokers were freed.

Soldier and worker control

Soldiers and workers brought public and military institutions under their control. When, against Souchon's promise, different troops advanced to quash the rebellion, they were intercepted by the mutineers and were either sent back or joined the sailors and workers. By the evening of 4 November, Kiel was firmly in the hands of approximately 40,000 rebellious sailors, soldiers and workers, as was Wilhelmshaven two days later.

Late in the evening of 4 November a meeting of sailors and workers representatives in the union house led to the establishment of a soldiers' and a workers' council. The Kiel 'Fourteen Points' of the soldiers' council were issued:

Resolutions and demands of the soldiers' council:
 The release of all inmates and political prisoners.
 Complete freedom of speech and the press.
 The abolition of mail censorship.
 Appropriate treatment of crews by superiors.
 No punishment for all comrades on returning to the ships and to the barracks.
 The launching of the fleet is to be prevented under all circumstances.
 Any defensive measures involving bloodshed are to be prevented.
 The withdrawal of all troops not belonging to the garrison.
 All measures for the protection of private property will be determined by the soldiers' council immediately.
 Superiors will no longer be recognized outside of duty.
 Unlimited personal freedom of every man from the end of his tour of duty until the beginning of his next tour of duty
 Officers who declare themselves in agreement with the measures of the newly established soldiers' council, are welcomed in our midst. All the others have to quit their duty without entitlement to provision.
 Every member of the soldiers' council is to be released from any duty.
 All measures to be introduced in the future can only be introduced with the consent of the soldiers' council.
These demands are orders of the soldiers' council and are binding for every military person.

Dirk Dähnhardt came to the following conclusion in his 1978 doctoral thesis: "The 14 points of Kiel were ... mainly an attack on the military system, political objectives were lacking widely." Dähnhardt attributes this on the one hand to the heterogeneous composition of the bodies, and on the other hand to the intention to first of all issue a catalogue of immediate measures.

Spreads all over Germany

During the following events, councils all over Germany oriented themselves on these 14 items. Dähnhardt saw this political shortsightedness as a major reason for the dissolution of soldiers' councils after six months.
Wolfram Wette from the German Armed Forces Military History Research Office noted: "... the Kiel signal ... did not point in the direction of a council state according to the Bolshevistic example. Instead it stood ... for the demand for the fastest possible ending of the war. Secondly it pointed – starting with the 'Kiel 14 points' – ... in the direction of a liberal, social and democratic political system, in which especially militarism ... should have no space any more."

On the same evening the SPD deputy Gustav Noske arrived in Kiel and was welcomed enthusiastically, although he had orders from the new government and the SPD leadership to bring the rising under control. He had himself elected chairman of the soldiers' council and reinstated peace and order. Some days later he took over the governor's post, while Lothar Popp from the USPD became chairman of the overall soldiers council. During the coming weeks Noske actually managed to reduce the influence of the councils in Kiel, but he could not prevent the spreading of the revolution to all of Germany. The events had already spread far beyond the city limits.

Regarding Noske's role in Kiel, Wette noted: "What he [Noske] however did not bring about, and possibly because of his political basic position was not able and did not want to bring about, was the exemplary test of a future oriented republic reform programme. Such an experiment would have been quite possible in Kiel – at any rate, in the military-political area. Attempts regarding persons and structures were there. Noske didn't foster and didn't utilize them, but suffocated them before they could develop."

Aftermath: German revolution of 1918–19 

Other seamen, soldiers and workers, in solidarity with the arrested, began electing workers' and soldiers' councils modeled after the Soviets of the Russian Revolution of 1917, and took over military and civil powers in many cities. On 7 November, the revolution had reached Munich, causing Ludwig III of Bavaria to flee.

See also
 End of World War I
 German Revolution
 Richard Stumpf

Naval mutinies:
 Soldat fusillé pour l'exemple
 Spithead and Nore mutinies
 Chilean naval mutiny of 1931
 HNLMS De Zeven Provinciën (1909)#Mutiny
 Royal Indian Navy Mutiny
 Kronstadt rebellion
 Invergordon Mutiny
 Revolt of the Lash

Literature 
 Dirk Dähnhardt: Revolution in Kiel. Der Ubergang vom Kaiserreich zur Weimarer Republik. Karl Wachholtz Verlag, Neumünster, 1978, 
 Horn, Daniel, German Naval Mutinies of World War I, Rutgers University Press, New Brunswick, New Jersey (USA), 1969.
 Horn, Daniel (Ed.), War, Mutiny and Revolution in the German Navy – The World War I Diary of Seaman Richard Stumpf. Rutgers University Press, New Brunswick, New Jersey (USA) 1967, VI,442 S.,
 Wolfram Wette: Gustav Noske – eine politische Biographie. Droste Verlag, 1987, 
 Wolfram Wette: Gustav Noske und die Revolution in Kiel 1918. Boyens Buchverlag, Heide 2010, ; published as special edition from the Gesellschaft für Kieler Stadtgeschichte, by Jürgen Jensen, Band 64

Films 
 Documentary film "In Kiel ist Revolution!" 53 minutes, 2018 (German version as DVD, English version as high definition mp4 format). By Kay Gerdes and Klaus Kuhl, published by the Gesellschaft für Kieler Stadtgeschichte e.V. as "Historische Filmdokumente Nr. 9". Sponsored by City of Kiel and Filmförderung Hamburg Schleswig-Holstein. The film highlights in detail the events in November 1918 in Kiel and presents them in a larger historical frame. The authors employ historical film- and photo-material, footage from original locations, interviews from the 1970s and 1980s with contemporary witnesses (among them Lothar Popp, one of the leaders of the uprising) and explanations by the historian, peace researcher and Noske-biograph Prof. Wolfram Wette. Hints for teachers, information on the used sources and the complete text are available online:

External links 

 Homepage from Kiel Interview with Lothar Popp; interviews with further contemporary witnesses; evaluations; detailed time-line with documents etc.
 Kiel Uprising: Women's activism and the German Revolution November 1918 highlights women's role in the German revolution of 1918, with a particular focus on Kiel.

References

Rebellions in Germany
Naval mutinies
German Revolution of 1918–1919
Naval history of Germany
Mutinies in World War I
November 1918 events